Adrienne Jüliger is a German fashion model.

Career
Jüliger was discovered outside a taping of Germany's Next Topmodel and debuted at Prada S/S 2015. In her debut New York Fashion Week she walked in 20 shows.

She has walked for Etro, Vera Wang, Coach, and Michael Kors.

Jüliger has been on the cover of Glamour Germany, Elle U.K., Miss Vogue, and i-D. In addition to Prada, she has appeared in campaigns for DKNY, Red Valentino, H&M, Zara, and John Frieda.

Jüliger was once ranked as a "Top 50" model by models.com.

References 

1997 births
Living people
German female models
People from Bonn